Aleksandra Ranković (born July 8, 1980) is a volleyball player from Serbia. She was a member of the Serbia and Montenegro women's National Team that won the bronze medal at the 2006 World Championship in Japan.

External links
 CEV profile
 bestsports.com

1980 births
Living people
Serbian women's volleyball players
Place of birth missing (living people)
21st-century Serbian women